Yashwant Gupta (born 1 November 1962) is an Indian astrophysicist and a professor at the National Centre for Radio Astrophysics (NCRA) of the Tata Institute of Fundamental Research.  He is currently a Distinguished Professor and also the Centre Director at NCRA.

Known for his research on pulsars and the interstellar medium, as well as development of instrumentation for radio astronomy, Gupta is a member of the International Astronomical Union, the International Union of Radio Science (URSI) and also a Senior Member of the IEEE. He is reported to have contributed to the construction and commissioning of the Giant Metrewave Radio Telescope (GMRT) in Pune, including the development and enhancements to the digital correlator for the GMRT. He also led the major upgrade of GMRT that was carried out during 2013 to 2019, which has resulted in the GMRT maintaining its position as one of the leading low frequency radio observatories in the world. For this achievement, Gupta and his team were awarded the Zubin Kembhavi Award in 2019 by the Astronomical Society of India.

His studies have been documented by way of a number of articles and Google Scholar, an online repository of scientific articles has listed 165 of them. He has also delivered several plenary speeches or keynote addresses and the speech on The upgraded GMRT : Current Status and Future Prospects at the University of California, Berkeley in December 2015 was one among them. The Council of Scientific and Industrial Research, the apex agency of the Government of India for scientific research, awarded him the Shanti Swarup Bhatnagar Prize for Science and Technology, one of the highest Indian science awards, for his contributions to physical sciences in 2007.

Selected bibliography

See also 

 Electromagnetic radiation
 Neutron star

Notes

References

Further reading 
 

Recipients of the Shanti Swarup Bhatnagar Award in Physical Science
Scientists from Maharashtra
Indian scientific authors
1962 births
Living people
Fellows of the Indian Academy of Sciences
Academic staff of Tata Institute of Fundamental Research
Indian astrophysicists